Once Upon a Time in Mumbaai is a 2010 Indian Hindi-language gangster film written by Rajat Arora and directed by Milan Luthria. It stars Ajay Devgn, Emraan Hashmi, Kangana Ranaut, Prachi Desai and Randeep Hooda. Produced by Ekta Kapoor under the Balaji Motion Pictures banner, Once Upon A Time in Mumbaai was released on 30 July 2010 to generally positive reviews from critics, and was a box office hit. The film is loosely based on the lives of Mumbai underworld gangsters Haji Mastan and Dawood Ibrahim. A sequel, Once Upon ay Time in Mumbai Dobaara!, was released in 2013.

Plot
The film opens in March 1993 in Bombay, with a suicide attempt by ACP Agnel Wilson on the pretext of the recent Bombay bombings. When questioned by his superior over his actions, he breaks down and claims that the bombings are his own fault. Wilson recounts that 18 years ago, when he was posted as the ACP in the Bombay crime branch, his inability to take necessary action led to the rise of Shoaib Khan, a dreaded gangster who played a central role in the bombings.

Throughout the film, Wilson narrates the story of 1970s Bombay, when it was ruled by a kind-hearted smuggler Sultan Mirza, and how Mirza's eventual downfall led to Shoaib's rise to power.

After being hit by a flood in his hometown of Madras, a young Mirza arrives in Bombay, where he lands a job as a coal shoveller near the docks. Despite his meagre earnings, Mirza never fails to help the poor and needy, which soon gains him their respect and admiration. Mirza has thus been given the nickname Sultan.

As a grown man, Sultan Mirza becomes the kingpin of Bombay's smuggling underworld in the '70s. Through his influence, Mirza peacefully divides the city among four gangsters, thus thwarting police efforts to curb illegal activities. Despite being a criminal, Sultan Mirza is portrayed as a man of principle with a heart of gold and a godfather-like figure to the people, even going to the extent of refraining from smuggling specific contraband like drugs which against his Muslim faith.

Meanwhile, Shoaib is even in childhood a very ambitious person with a dark and daring character, who is frequently involved in petty theft. His father, Hussain Khan, who is a Sub-Inspector with the Bombay Police, tries in vain to guide and control his son; his anger against Shoaib began years ago when Shoaib and his best friend Javed were stealing money and got caught red handed by a man, by teaching his son a lesson, Hussain slapped him 5 times. Hussain locks Shoaib in jail, but Shoaib angers him as both Shoaib and Wilson make a deal saying that Shoaib wants to follow another path. Worried, Hussain turns to Sultan for help. Sultan agrees and helps the young man set up an electronics shop. But Shoaib is unsatisfied, as his only real ambition is to become rich and powerful, like Sultan, who is his idol.

Mirza has a crush on actress Rehana and the two eventually begin dating. Sultan invests black money in her upcoming films. Wilson moves to stop Rehana's films funded by Sultan. Later, Sultan and Rehana frame Wilson to make it look as if Wilson is accepting a bribe, which damages his credibility.

Shoaib's beautiful girlfriend, Mumtaz, works in a local jewellery shop, which Shoaib visits often, to the aggravation of her boss. Shoaib gives her a beautiful necklace, which, unbeknownst to Mumtaz, Shoaib had stolen from a lady during a home robbery. Later, that lady comes to the shop with her husband to buy more jewellery. The lady soon recognizes her own necklace being worn by Mumtaz and accuses her of allegedly stealing her jewellery and publicly insults her. Following this, Mumtaz admits to the outraged customer that her boyfriend had given the item to her. The lady and her husband demand she takes them to her boyfriend's shop, where they confront him. This enrages Shoaib, who beats up the husband and destroys his own shop.

Shoaib goes to Sultan and asks to be a part of his crime ring. Seeing his potential, Sultan agrees to take him under his wing. Shoaib learns the tricks of the trade and soon becomes Sultan's trusted aide. Wilson hatches a plan to use Shoaib's reckless ambition for quick money and power as a way to cause the downfall of Sultan. Wilson even refrains from killing Sultan and Shoaib when he has the opportunity, however Wilson's plan backfires. Finally, when Shoaib becomes invincible, Wilson blames himself for the subsequent catastrophe as he now cannot stop Shoaib's rise to power.

In 1975, Sultan decides to hand over his power to Shoaib, and opts to enter state politics. He travels to Delhi to meet the Home Minister of India Jeet Kumar Rathi. Shoaib's unscrupulous ambitions lead him to carry out trades and acts which Sultan himself would strongly condemn and abhor, including manufacturing illicit liquor, accepting contract killings, investing in drug peddling, and running extortion rackets. When Sultan returns to Bombay, he learns of Shoaib's misdeeds and is outraged. He finds Shoaib at a party and slaps him in public for his unethical activities and states he can never really be like Sultan. This infuriates Shoaib and he plots his revenge as he now knows that Sultan and he cannot possibly rule Bombay together due to Sultan's strong principles and moral ethos. The next day, as Sultan campaigns for his new party, Shoaib appears and assassinates Sultan while he is addressing the people at the rally as a horrified Wilson looks on, thus ending the reign of the smuggler who was loved by his people.

Back in 1993, Wilson laments that he and the police are responsible for the bombings because of their lack of forethought. Wilson also says that 18 years later, Shoaib now rules Bombay despite living abroad, and the people are now forever at his mercy. As Bombay's new underworld kingpin, he has since established a global criminal empire, which leaves any and all governments and forces no chance to reach him.

Cast

 Ajay Devgan as Sultan Mirza, a character based on Haji Mastan
 Emraan Hashmi as Criminal Shoaib Khan, a character based on Dawood Ibrahim
 Kangana Ranaut as Rehana, a character based on Sona Mastan, Haji Mastan's wife
 Prachi Desai as Mumtaz, a character based on Mehjabin Shaikh, Dawood Ibrahim's wife
 Randeep Hooda as Additional Commissioner Of Police Officer Agnel Wilson, a character based on Julio Ribeiro (police officer)
 Naved Aslam as Patrick, Sultan's henchman
 Mehul Bhojak as Javed, Shoaib's friend
 Asif Basra as Inspector Hussain Khan, Shoaib's father, a character based on Head-constable Ibrahim Kaskar
 Sumit Kaul as Chhota Rajan
 Avtar Gill as Jeet Kumar Rathi, Home Minister of India
 Hemant Choudhary as Actor Vijay, Film Star 
 Vikas Shrivastav as Verghese
 Prithvi Zutshi as IG Aditya Mandke
 Gauahar Khan as item number in song "Parda" 
 Yogesh Tripathi as Minister office peon

Production
The film was made on a budget of 38 crore ( 28 crore for production and  100 million for publicity and advertising).

Inspiration for the film
The film depicts the growth of the Mumbai underworld, from crime and smuggling in its early stages to its connection with international terrorism in recent times. It is believed to be based on the lives of real-life gangsters Haji Mastan and Dawood Ibrahim, portrayed by the characters Sultan and Shoaib, respectively. Originally Sanjay Dutt was chosen to play the role of Haji Mastan but the role went to Ajay Devgn instead.

Critical reception
Rajeev Masand of CNN-IBN rated the film 2.5 out of 5 saying, "The film is watchable and enjoyable in parts even, but it doesn't quite pull off the retro chic tone it was going for". IANS rated the movie 3.5 out of 5 saying, "Rajat Arora's dialogues flow from the storytelling in a smooth flow of poetry and street wisdom." Taran Adarsh of Bollywood Hungama gave it 4/5 and called it "An outstanding Cinematic experience". Nikhat Kazmi of the Times of India gave it 4/5 and stated, "Once Upon A Time in Mumbaai offers you both substance and soul, even as it dabbles with a slice of reality". Rediff gave it 4/5 and said, "Book your tickets now".

Box office

India

Once Upon A Time in Mumbaai managed to have a decent weekend despite starting slowly. The film picked up from Friday evening and managed to have good Saturday and Sunday collections. The approximate breakdowns are 55.0 million (Friday), 70 million (Saturday) and 77.5 million (Sunday) for a 202.5 million weekend. The film grossed Rs. 585.0 million in India at the end of its ninth week. Once Upon A Time in Mumbaai was declared a hit by Box Office India.

Overseas
In its opening weekend the film showed a day-wise growth in U.K. [Friday £15,755, Saturday £19,381 and Sunday £19,644] and a decent start in U.S. [approx. $ at 32 venues]. In its second weekend, the film collected £16,249 on 14 screens, with the per screen average working out to £1,161. Total: £1,07,988 at U.K boxoffice. In its third weekend, the film collected £5,909 on 8 screens, with the per screen average working out to £739 (total: £ in U.K.). In its fourth weekend in U.K, the film collected £743 on four screens, with the per screen average working out to £186 (total: £1,26,696). In its fifth weekend in the U.K, the film collected £105 on two screens, with the per screen average working out to £53 (total: £1,27,338). In its fifth weekend at the U.S. boxoffice, the film collected $1,131 on two screens, with the per screen average working out to $566 (total: $3,02,862).

Accolades 

The film received many awards at several award functions. Ajay Devgn and Prachi Desai received accolades for their nominations, while other awards were won for the film's music, playback and technical direction.

Soundtrack

The film's songs were released on 28 June 2010. There were a total of 14 songs composed by Pritam with lyrics penned by Irshad Kamil, Neelesh Misra and Amitabh Bhattacharya.

The film score was composed by Sandeep Shirodkar.
All Qawwali Voices By Rakesh Pandit, Sabri Brothers, Irfan And Arshad.
 
Additional Chorus And Backing Voice By Rana Mazumder, Anupam Amod, Joy, Clint, Mariam, Niesha.

The song "Parda" is a medley containing samples from the following 1970's Bollywood songs; "Duniya Mein Logon Ko" (Apna Desh), "Piya Tu Ab To Aaja" (Caravan). The song "I'm A Man" by Black Strobe was also used as a background soundtrack uncredited.

Sequel

Due to the film's commercial and critical success, a sequel was planned. Akshay Kumar and Imran Khan were roped in as the male leads. The sequel, Once Upon Ay Time in Mumbai Dobaara!, features Sonakshi Sinha playing the role of actress Mandakini, whilst Sonali Bendre was also roped in for a role. The film started shooting in August 2012, whilst the film released on 15 August 2013, thus avoids clashing with Rohit Shetty directorial Chennai Express, starring Shah Rukh Khan and Deepika Padukone, which released one week before the release of OUATIMD. The film was a flop at the box office as it had very slow opening with very low occupancy while Chennai Express was breaking various box office records throughout its release.

References

Further reading

External links

 
 
 

Indian crime action films
2010 films
Films about organised crime in India
Films set in Mumbai
2010s Hindi-language films
2010 crime thriller films
2010 crime action films
2010 action thriller films
Indian action thriller films
Indian crime thriller films
Films featuring songs by Pritam
Hindi-language films based on actual events
Fictional portrayals of the Maharashtra Police
Indian gangster films
Balaji Motion Pictures films
Indian films based on actual events
Films directed by Milan Luthria
D-Company